David Rodney Lewis (born July 3, 1953) is a Canadian former National Hockey League (NHL) defenceman and coach. He was most recently an assistant coach of the Carolina Hurricanes of the NHL. He has both Canadian and U.S. citizenship.

Playing career
Lewis began his playing career with the Saskatoon Blades of the Western Canada Hockey League. He was drafted by the New York Islanders in the 1973 NHL Entry Draft, third round, thirty-third overall. He played sixteen seasons with the New York Islanders, Los Angeles Kings, New Jersey Devils, and Detroit Red Wings, scoring 36 goals and 224 points in 1,008 games.

Coaching career
After Lewis' playing career ended with the Red Wings in the 1987–88 season, he stayed with the team as an assistant coach. He helped Detroit win three Stanley Cups in 1997, 1998, and 2002. When Scotty Bowman retired in 2002, Lewis was named head coach of the Red Wings. In two seasons, he guided the Red Wings to two 48-win campaigns, including a Presidents' Trophy. In the playoffs, however, he had a record of 6–10. After the lockout ended, his contract was allowed to expire on June 30, 2005. He was re-hired by the Red Wings on August 9, 2005, as a scout.

On June 29, 2006, Lewis was named the 27th head coach of the Boston Bruins. His one and only season with the Bruins was not successful, as they finished with a 35–41–6 record, missing the playoffs for the second year in a row, and finishing in last place in the Northeast Division. In June 2007, Lewis was fired as coach of the Bruins by general manager Peter Chiarelli because of the team's highly inconsistent play throughout the season.

Lewis subsequently signed on as an assistant coach for the Los Angeles Kings for the 2007–2008 season. On August 4, 2008, it was announced he would not return for the 2008–2009 season.

On November 5, 2010, Lewis, whose maternal grandparents were from Ukraine, was hired as the coach of the Ukrainian national team, though his association with that team was short-lived.

On June 7, 2011, Lewis was hired as the assistant coach of the Carolina Hurricanes. Lewis was fired along with head coach Kirk Muller and assistant coach John MacLean on May 5, 2014.

In December 2014, Lewis was hired as the head coach of the Belarusian national team. The contract was for one year with the possibility of extension up to the 2018 Olympics. Lewis has been the head coach for Belarus at the 2015, 2016, 2017, and 2018 World Championships. However, the team fell just short of qualifying for the 2018 Olympics. Lewis was fired just three games into the 2018 World Championships after Belarus lost all three games.

Career statistics

Regular season and playoffs

Coaching record

See also
 List of NHL players with 1,000 games played

References

External links

Dave Lewis Profile at NHL.com

1953 births
Living people
Belarus men's national ice hockey team coaches
Boston Bruins coaches
Canadian expatriate ice hockey people in the United States
Canadian ice hockey coaches
Canadian ice hockey defencemen
Canadian people of Scottish descent
Canadian people of Ukrainian descent
Carolina Hurricanes coaches
Detroit Red Wings coaches
Detroit Red Wings players
Detroit Red Wings scouts
Edmonton Oilers (WHA) draft picks
Ice hockey people from Saskatchewan
Los Angeles Kings coaches
Los Angeles Kings players
National Hockey League assistant coaches
New Jersey Devils players
New York Islanders draft picks
New York Islanders players
Saskatoon Blades players
Sportspeople from Kindersley
Stanley Cup champions
Ukraine men's national ice hockey team coaches
Canadian expatriate sportspeople in Ukraine
Canadian expatriate sportspeople in Belarus
Naturalized citizens of the United States